Injoy is an album by the Memphis, Tennessee-based funk band The Bar-Kays.

Reception

Released on Mercury Records in October 1979, this album reached number two on the Billboard Soul Album chart. It was the band's biggest selling album, and their second to be certified Gold for sales of over 500,000 copies. The album’s first single, Move Your Boogie Body, was a Top 3 hit on the Billboard R&B singles chart. The album’s third track, Running In And Out Of My Life, also received substantial airplay and was a hit on R&B radio stations. It is one of the few Bar-Kays songs where the lead vocal is not performed by Larry Dodson. Sherman Guy performed the lead vocal with Dodson adding backgrounds.

Track listing
"More and More"   	 4:27   	
"Move Your Boogie Body" 	6:17 	
"Running In and Out of My Life" 	4:44 	
"Girl I'm on Your Side" 	3:59 	
"Loving You is My Occupation" 	4:59 	
"Today is The Day" 	3:11 	
"You've Been" 	4:01 	
"Up in Here" 	5:07

Charts

Singles

References

External links
 The Bar-Kays-Injoy at Discogs

1979 albums
Bar-Kays albums
Mercury Records albums